Enation is an American indie rock band formed in Battle Ground, Washington in 2004. The band currently resides in Nashville, TN.

History
Brothers and actors Jonathan Jackson and Richard Lee Jackson originally formed the music group that came to be known as Enation in 2003.

In 2017, Jonathan and Richard invited their friend Jonathan Thatcher (formerly of Delirious?) to tour with them. The three have continued touring and creating new music in the studio.

Jonathan, the band's frontman, sings, plays guitar, piano, and writes most of the songs. Richard plays drums and percussion and sings backup vocals, with Jonathan Thatcher on bass and bass synth.

Enation have landed on the Billboard Top 10 ("Live From Nashville" DVD, #9) and have garnered numerous radio and TV appearances including live performances on The View and VH1’s Big Morning Buzz Live.

Enation was originally formed in 2003 with bassist Daniel Sweatt, who exited the band in 2017, wanting to spend more time with his family. "Ride," Enation's first single from their 2004 debut independent album, Identity Theft, was featured as the theme song to Riding the Bullet, a Stephen King thriller which also stars Jonathan Jackson. The band later released more independent albums between 2007-2011: Soul & Story: Volume One, Where the Fire Starts, World In Flight, and My Ancient Rebellion, among other live albums and specialty EP's.

Bethany Joy Lenz, who played Haley James Scott on the CW television drama One Tree Hill, recorded Enation's song "Feel This" for use in the fifth-season finale of the series. After the episode aired the song became a top 10 song on iTunes rock charts. The band also made a cameo appearance on the show, playing Feel This and the title track from their 2008 album World In Flight.

In 2017 ENATION released their full length alternative rock album "Anthems For The Apocalypse" produced by Greg Archilla, who is known for his work with Matchbox Twenty and Collective Soul through Hilasterion Records, distributed by MRI / RED Distribution.

Discography

References

External links 
 Official Website

Musical groups established in 2002
Indie rock musical groups from Washington (state)
2002 establishments in Washington (state)